Sisurcana obscura is a species of moth of the family Tortricidae. It is found in Loja Province, Ecuador.

The wingspan is about 30 mm. The ground colour of the forewings is brownish, in the distal third and submedially tinged with ferruginous. There are sparse brown dots all over the wing. The hindwings are dirty cream with transverse brownish grey strigulation (fine streaks).

Etymology
The species name refers to the colouration of the species and is derived from Latin obscura (meaning dark).

References

Moths described in 2008
Sisurcana
Moths of South America
Taxa named by Józef Razowski